William W. Knox (June 18, 1911 – August 30, 1981) was a United States district judge of the United States District Court for the Western District of Pennsylvania.

Education and career

Born in Erie, Pennsylvania, Knox received an Artium Baccalaureus degree from the University of Michigan in 1932 and a Juris Doctor from the University of Michigan Law School in 1935. He was in private practice in Erie from 1935 to 1970.

Federal judicial service

On September 28, 1970, Knox was nominated by President Richard Nixon to a new seat on the United States District Court for the Western District of Pennsylvania created by 84 Stat. 294. He was confirmed by the United States Senate on October 8, 1970, and received his commission on October 14, 1970. Knox served in that capacity until his death, on August 30, 1981, in Erie.

References

Sources
 

1911 births
1981 deaths
Judges of the United States District Court for the Western District of Pennsylvania
United States district court judges appointed by Richard Nixon
20th-century American judges
University of Michigan Law School alumni
University of Michigan alumni